George Henry Noonan (18 October 1894 – 26 February 1972) was an  Australian rules footballer who played with St Kilda in the Victorian Football League (VFL).

Notes

External links 

George Noonan's playing statistics from The VFA Project

1894 births
1972 deaths
Australian rules footballers from Victoria (Australia)
St Kilda Football Club players
Hawthorn Football Club (VFA) players